IsoBuster is a data recovery computer program by Smart Projects, a Belgian company founded in 1995 by Peter Van Hove. As of version 3.0, it can recover data from damaged file systems or physically damaged disks including optical discs, hard disk drives, USB flash drives and solid-state disks. It has the ability to access "deleted" data on multisession optical discs, and allows users to access disc images (including ISO, BIN and NRG) and to extract files in the same way that they would from a ZIP archive. IsoBuster is also often used by law enforcement and data forensics experts.

See also 
 List of data recovery software

References

External links
 
 Story by the author of IsoBuster, how it all began

Windows-only shareware
Data recovery software